Schizothorax griseus is a species of ray-finned fish in the genus Schizothorax.  It is found in the basins of the Yangtze River basin, the upper Pearl River and the upper Mekong River in southern China.

References 

Schizothorax
Fish described in 1931